Bew Springs is an unincorporated community located in Grenada County, Mississippi and part of the Grenada Micropolitan Statistical Area .

Bew Springs is located on the former Illinois Central Railroad and was once home to a general store.

A post office operated under the name Bew Springs from 1909 to 1918.

References

Unincorporated communities in Grenada County, Mississippi
Unincorporated communities in Mississippi